Nirogacestat (PF-03084014) is a selective gamma secretase inhibitor developed by SpringWorks Therapeutics that has potential anti-tumor activity. It was granted FDA breakthrough drug designation in September 2019 for adult patients with progressive, unresectable, recurrent or refractory desmoid tumors or deep fibromatosis.

Medical uses 
Nirogacestat is currently in Phase 2 clinical trials for unresectable desmoid tumors. In addition, a Phase 3 clinical trial, DeFi, is currently in progress for nirogacestat for adults with desmoid tumors and aggressive fibromatosis. In addition, three trials are presently recruiting patients that include nirogacestat with other anticancer therapies in multiple myeloma, including the UNIVERSAL study for nirogacestat with the allogeneic CAR-T therapy ALLO-715.

References 

Experimental drugs
Chemotherapy
Gamma secretase inhibitors
Breakthrough therapy
Tetralins
Imidazoles
Fluoroarenes
Amides
Secondary amines